60s 70s 80s is a triple A-side single, Namie Amuro's 33rd solo single under the Avex Trax label. It was released in CD and CD&DVD formats on March 12, 2008, 11 months since her previous single "Funky Town", and nearly nine months after her successful album Play. This single continues her successful comeback, as it had her highest first week sales since 2000's "Never End" even at a time when CD single sales are dramatically decreasing. It became her first #1 since 1998's "I Have Never Seen", and her highest selling single since "Never End".

Overview 

"60s 70s 80s" is the 33rd single and the first triple A-Side single released by Amuro Namie, and contains a total of three songs, "New Look", "Rock Steady", and "What a Feeling". Each of these three songs is used in a massive campaign ad for Vidal Sassoon's latest shampoo and conditioner products. In addition, each song represents a certain time period starting with the 1960s, then 1970's, and finally 1980's.

The first song, "New Look", represents the 1960s and features a sample from The Supremes's "Baby Love". Like many of her other single songs, this song is produced by T.Kura and Michico. "Rock Steady" represents the 1970s and features a sample from Aretha Franklin's song "Rock Steady". It is produced by Michico and Muro, whose last working with Namie was during her Suite Chic project. The last song, "What a Feeling" represents the 1980s and features samples from Irene Cara's "Flashdance... What a Feeling", which was used as the theme for the 1983 film Flashdance. Shinichi Osawa and Michico worked on the production of "What a Feeling".

Namie first performed these songs on January 17, 2008 in front of a selected audience of 150 people. Her second official performance of these songs is in the second leg of her tour PLAY More 07-08. The promotional videos of "New Look" and "Rock Steady" were released in January, with the video for "What a Feeling" premiering on March 1 on MTV.

In just two days, this single surpassed the first week sales of "Baby Don't Cry", her best selling single since "Say the Word" in 2001 despite not reaching the #1 position on the dailies by its release. However, within four days of its release the single reached the #1 spot on the charts. This became Namie's first #1 on the Oricon Daily Chart since 2004's, "Girl Talk / The Speed Star". The single debuted at #2 on the weekly charts with over 114,000 copies sold and became Amuro's highest first week sales since 2000's "Never End". A week after its release, the single reached #1 on the weekly chart, making it Amuro's 10th number one single and her first number one single in 10 years. By its third week of release however, the single reached #2 on the Oricon charts, being kicked off the top position by 20th Century's Ore Ja Nakya, Kimi Ja Nakya  by a mere 1,686 copies.

Track list

Personnel 
 "New Look"
Namie Amuro – vocals
Namie Amuro, Tiger, Michico – background vocals
T.Kura – all instruments
 "Rock Steady"
Namie Amuro – vocals
SUI – programming & keys
 "What a Feeling"
Namie Amuro – vocals
Shinichi Osawa – all instruments

Production 
 "New Look"
Producer – T.Kura
Vocal Producer – Michico
Director – Yuichi Kodama
Choreographer – Moritsune Morita, Nami Segawa, & Raymond Johnson
 "Rock Steady"
Producer – Muro
Vocal Producer – Michico
Director – Yusuke Tanaka
Choreographer – Shun
 "What a Feeling"
Producer – Shinichi Osawa
Vocal Producer – Michico
Director – Takeshi Nakamura
Choreographer – Tetsuharu

Release history

TV performances 
 March 10, 2008 – Hey! Hey! Hey! Music Champ
 March 21, 2008 – Music Fighter
 March 23, 2008 – CDTV
 March 27, 2008 – Utaban
 April 5, 2008 – Music Fair 21
 November 27, 2008 – Best Hit Songs Festival 2008
 December 16, 2008 – Best Artist 2008
 December 30, 2008 – Japan Record Awards
 January 1, 2009 – CDTV Countdown Live 2008-2009

Charts 
Oricon Sales Chart (Japan)

Billboard Japan Chart

RIAJ certification
"60s 70s 80s" has been certified platinum for shipments of over 250,000 by the Recording Industry Association of Japan.

References

2008 EPs
Namie Amuro albums
Oricon Weekly number-one singles
Billboard Japan Hot 100 number-one singles
Avex Trax singles